Rasmus Lerdorf (born 22 November 1968) is a Danish-Canadian programmer. He co-authored and inspired the PHP scripting language, authoring the first two versions of the language and participating in the development of later versions led by a group of developers including Jim Winstead (who later created blo.gs), Stig Bakken, Shane Caraveo, Andi Gutmans, and Zeev Suraski. He continues to contribute to the project.

Early life and education
Lerdorf was born on Disko Island in Greenland and moved to Denmark in his early years. Lerdorf's family moved to Canada from Denmark in 1980, and later moved to King City, Ontario in 1983. He graduated from King City Secondary School in 1988, and in 1993 he graduated from the University of Waterloo with a Bachelor of Applied Science in Systems Design Engineering. He contributed to the Apache HTTP Server and he added the LIMIT clause to the mSQL DBMS. A variant of this LIMIT clause had already been around for a decade in mainframe relational database management systems (like Oracle Rdb running on VMS, formerly from Digital Equipment Corporation), but apparently it had not yet been picked up by the emerging PC-based databases. It was later adapted by several other SQL-compatible DBMS. He released the first version of PHP in 1995.

Career
From September 2002 to November 2009 Lerdorf was employed by Yahoo! Inc. as an Infrastructure Architecture Engineer. In 2010, he joined WePay in order to develop their application programming interface. Throughout 2011 he was a roving consultant for startups. On 22 February 2012 he announced on Twitter that he had joined Etsy. In July 2013 Lerdorf joined Jelastic as a senior advisor to help them with the creation of new technology.

Lerdorf is a frequent speaker at Open Source conferences around the world. During his keynote presentation at OSCMS 2007, he presented a security vulnerability in each of the projects represented at the conference that year.

Lerdorf also appeared at the WeAreDevelopers Conferences 2017 and 2019, making a speech on the history of PHP, the new PHP 7 release in 2017, and the 25 years of PHP.

Award
In 2003, Lerdorf was named in the MIT Technology Review TR100 as one of the top 100 innovators in the world under the age of 35.

See also

 List of University of Waterloo people

References

External links

Rasmus Lerdorf at O'Reilly Media

Greenlandic Inuit people
Greenlandic people of Danish descent
Danish computer scientists
Greenlandic emigrants to Canada
Free software programmers
University of Waterloo alumni
King City Secondary School alumni
People from Qaasuitsup
1968 births
Living people
Web developers
PHP writers
Programming language designers
Danish computer programmers
People from Qeqertarsuaq
20th-century Canadian scientists
21st-century Canadian scientists